Miroslav Petronijević (born 6 December 1987) is a Serbian football midfielder.

References

External links
 
 Miroslav Petronijević stats at utakmica.rs 
 

1987 births
Living people
Footballers from Belgrade
Association football midfielders
Serbian footballers
FK Čukarički players
FK Radnički Nova Pazova players
FK Radnički Pirot players
FK Rad players
FK Napredak Kruševac players
FK Voždovac players
FK Sloga Petrovac na Mlavi players
Serbian First League players
Serbian SuperLiga players